This article describes all the 2010 seasons of Formula Renault series across the world.

Formula Renault 3.5L

Formula Renault 2.0L

2010 Formula Renault 2.0 Eurocup season

2010 Formula Renault 2.0 Northern European Cup season

2010 Formula Renault 2.0 UK season

2010 Formula Renault 2.0 UK Winter Series
 See 2010 Formula Renault UK season.

2010 Formula Renault BARC season

2010 Formula Renault BARC Winter Series
 See 2010 Formula Renault UK season.

2010 Formula Renault 2.0 Italia season
Point system : 32, 28, 24, 22, 20, 18, 16, 14, 12, 10, 8, 6, 4, 2, 1 for 15th. In each race 2 points for Fastest lap and 2 for Pole position.
Races : 2 race by rounds length of 30 minutes each.

2010 Formula Renault 2.0 Middle European Championship season
Replace the Formula Renault 2.0 Switzerland. Also known as LO MEC championship.

Point system : 25, 22, 20, 18, 16, 14, 12, 10, 8, 6, 5, 4, 3, 2, 1 for 15th. Extra 1 point for Fastest lap and 2 points for Pole position.
Races : 2 races per round.

(1) = ineligible for points during the first 2 race weekends
(2) = ineligible for points during the first race weekend

2010 Formule Renault 2.0 North European Zone and Sweden season
Point system : 25, 18, 15, 12, 10, 8, 6, 4, 2, 1 for 10th. 1 point for Fastest lap and 1 for Pole position.
All FR2.0 Sweden rounds were held together with NEZ series and vice versa. The two series use the same point system and hence final standings of the two championships are identical.

2010 Formula Renault 2.0 Finland season
Point system : 25, 18, 15, 12, 10, 8, 6, 4, 2, 1.

2010 Asian Formula Renault Challenge season
Point system : 30, 24, 20, 17, 15, 13, 11, 9, 7, 5, 4, 3, 2, 1 for 14th. No points for Fastest lap or Pole position. Drivers, that start their season at round 5 or later, don't receive any points for the final standing. The team point attribution is different from the driver point system : 10, 8, 6, 5, 4, 3, 2, 1.
Races : 2 races by rounds.

The Asian Challenge Category (A) reward the best Asian driver. All races were held in China.

Rounds a and b indicate pre season races that didn't count toward championship standing.

Formula Renault 1.6L

2010 F4 Eurocup 1.6 season

Replace the Formul'Academy Euro Series.

Other Formulas powered by Renault championships

2010 GP2 Series seasons

The GP2 Series and GP2 Asia Series are powered by 4 litre Renault V8 engines and Bridgestone tyres with a Dallara chassis.

2010 GP3 Series seasons

2010 V de V Challenge Monoplace season

2010 Austria Formel Renault Cup season
The season will be probably held on 14 rounds in 7 venues in Czech Republic, Germany, France and Austria. The races occur with other categories cars: Austrian Formula 3, Formelfrei and Formula 3,5L like (Renault 3,5L from Words Series, Lola Cosworth). This section present only the Austrian Formula Renault 2.0L classification.
Point system : 20, 15, 12, 10, 8, 6, 4, 3, 2, 1 for 10th. No points for Fastest lap or Pole position.

(1) = Thomas and Manuel Amweg share their car for the venue.

2010 Formula 2000 Light season
This is the third season of the Formula 2000 Light held in Italy. The series use Tatuus Formula Renault or Dallara Formula 3 chassis with 2000 cc maximum engines and Michelin tyres. This year a Formula 2000 Top without Tatuus chassis and less powerful Formula 1600 Light (1.6L) classes are introduced and race mixed up with the main F2000 class.
Point system : 32, 28, 24, 22, 20, 18, 16, 14, 12, 10, 8, 6, 4, 2, 1 for 15th. In each race 2 point for Fastest lap. 3 points for Pole position in first race.
Races : 2 races by rounds.

The F2000 championship reward several sub categories : 
Over 35 : for drivers older than 35 years old (+).
Under 17 : for drivers younger than 17 years old (-).
Formula 3 : for drivers using Formula 3 chassis (F3).
Team : for racing team involved in all venues.

The rounds a and b held in Franciacorta, March 13–14 are the opening venue and doesn't reward points.

† = Did not finish but classified for standing

(-) = Indicate drivers younger than 17 years old.
(+) = Indicate drivers older than 35 years old.
(F3) = Indicate drivers using Dallara Formula 3 chassis with Opel or Fiat engine.
(FA)= Formula Abarth
(FG)= Formula Gloria
(FM)= Formula Master
(w) = indicate women drivers

2010 Formula 2000 Light Winter Trophy
Point system: 32, 28, 24, 22, 20, 18, 16, 14, 12, 10, 8, 6, 4, 2, 1 for 15th. Also 3 points for pole position and 2 for fasted lap.

2010 F2000 de las Américas season
Point system: unknown.
Races: 2 races per round.

2010 Formula Renault 2.0 Argentina season
All cars use Tito 02 chassis.
 Point system : 20, 15, 12, 10, 8, 6, 4, 3, 2, 1 for 10th. 1 point for Pole position. 1 extra point in each race for participating driver.

2010 Fórmula Renault Plus season
The series is held partially on the same rounds than its secondary series Fórmula Renault Interprovencial. It use Crespi chassis.
 Point system : 20, 15, 12, 10, 8, 6, 4, 3, 2, 1 for 10th. Extra 1 point for Pole position. All drivers receive 1 point for take part of the qualifying session.

2010 Fórmula Renault Interprovencial season
The series is held in the same rounds than its main series Fórmula Renault Plus.
 Point system : 20, 15, 12, 10, 8, 6, 4, 3, 2, 1 for 10th. Extra 1 point for Pole position. All drivers receive 1 point for take part of the qualifying session.

2010 Fórmula Metropolitana season
The series was held in Argentina. Cars use Renault Clio K4M engine (1598cc) with low power than the former Fórmula 4 Nacional series held in 2007. Teams can choose chassis manufacturer (Crespi, Tulia, Tito...).
 Point system : 20, 15, 12, 10, 8, 6, 4, 3, 2, 1 for 10th. Extra 1 point for Pole position and 1 point for completed race.

Formula One
Teams powered by Renault Engines in the 2010 Formula One season. Both teams are using the Renault RS27 V8 engine.
 Renault F1 Team: 
 Red Bull Racing:

References

External links
2010 standings at formularenault-2008.gpworld-online.com

Renault
Formula Renault seasons